Hieracium bolanderi or Bolander's hawkweed  is a North American plant species in the tribe Cichorieae within the family Asteraceae. It is found primarily in the mountains of western Oregon and northern California in the United States, although there are reports of the species farther south in the San Bernardino Mountains in southern California and also in Baja California in Mexico.

One stalk will produce 3-40 flower heads in a flat-topped array. Each head has 6-12 yellow ray flowers but no disc flowers.

References

bolanderi
Flora of Oregon
Flora of Baja California
Flora of California
Plants described in 1868
Flora without expected TNC conservation status